Dallas Texans  may refer to:

American football
Dallas Texans (NFL), 1952 team in the National Football League
Dallas Texans (AFL), 1960–1962 team that is now the Kansas City Chiefs
Dallas Texans (arena), 1990–1993 Arena Football League team

Ice hockey
Dallas Texans (AHA), 1941–1942 team in the American Hockey Association
Dallas Texans (USHL), 1945–1949 team in the United States Hockey League (1945–1951)